Lest We Forget is a 1947 military documentary produced by the U.S. Army and signal corps.

Plot summary
Consisting of newsreels and official government photos, the film shows what Eisenhower and American troops saw when they liberated concentration camps .

References

1947 films
Documentary films about World War II
1947 documentary films
Black-and-white documentary films
American documentary films
1940s American films